"You Won't Let Go" is the lead single, released on February 4, 2014, from Michael W. Smith's album, Sovereign.

Background
It was released to the iTunes Store on February 4, 2014 and opened at No. 13 on the Billboard Hot Christian Songs chart.

Live performances 
Smith performed the song for the first time at the contemporary Christian music radio programming service K-LOVE in early January.

Charts

References 

2014 singles
2014 songs
Michael W. Smith songs
Songs written by Michael W. Smith
Capitol Records singles
Sparrow Records singles
Songs written by Mia Fieldes